UTC−08:00 is an identifier for a time offset from UTC of −08:00. This time is used:

As standard time (Northern Hemisphere winter)
Principal cities: Los Angeles, San Francisco Bay Area, San Diego, Sacramento, Las Vegas, Portland, Seattle,  Vancouver, Victoria, Tijuana

North America
 Canada (Pacific Time Zone)
 British Columbia
 Except Northern Rockies Regional Municipality, Peace River Regional District, and the south-eastern communities of Cranbrook, Golden,  Invermere and Kimberley
 Mexico
 Baja California
 United States (Pacific Time Zone)
 California
 Idaho
 North of Salmon River
 Nevada (except West Wendover)
 Oregon
 All of the state except Malheur County (but including a small strip in the south of Malheur)
 Washington

As daylight saving time (Northern Hemisphere summer)
Principal city: Anchorage

North America
United States (Alaska Time Zone)
Alaska
Except Aleutian Islands west of 169.30°W

As standard time (year-round)
Principal settlement: Adamstown

Oceania

Pacific Ocean

Polynesia 
France
Clipperton Island

United Kingdom
Pitcairn Islands
Ducie Island
Oeno Island
Henderson Island

See also 
 Effects of time zones on North American broadcasting
 Time in Canada
 Time in France
 Time in Mexico
 Time in the United States
 Time in the United Kingdom

References

External links

UTC offsets